Tobacco leaf curl viruses (TLCV) are several species of plant pathogenic viruses in the genus Begomovirus.

References

Further reading

External links
ICTVdB - The Universal Virus Database: Tobacco leaf curl virus
Family Groups - The Baltimore Method

Begomovirus
Viral plant pathogens and diseases
Unaccepted virus taxa